In Greek mythology, Penthus (Πενθος) was the personification of grief. When Zeus began passing out domains to the various gods, Penthus was not there. As such, Penthus received the one domain no one wanted: grief and sadness. It is believed that he likes to torment the same individuals; he favors those who weep for the dead.

References

Greek gods
Personifications in Greek mythology